This is a list of members of the European Parliament for the Netherlands in the 2004 to 2009 session, ordered by name and by party.

Party representation

Mutations

2004
 10 June: Election for the European Parliament in the Netherlands.
 20 July: Beginning of the 6th European Parliament session. (2004–2009)

2005
 April: Els de Groen leaves the Europe Transparent party and continues as an independent. She does remain part of the Greens–European Free Alliance group.

2007
 22 February: Camiel Eurlings (CDA) leaves the European Parliament, because he became a minister in the Fourth Balkenende cabinet.
 1 March: Joop Post (CDA) is installed in the European Parliament as a replacement for Camiel Eurlings.
 10 April: Albert Jan Maat (CDA) leaves the European Parliament, because he became the chairman for LTO Nederland.
 12 April: Esther de Lange (CDA) is installed in the European Parliament as a replacement for Albert Jan Maat.
 1 September: Max van den Berg (PvdA) leaves the European Parliament, because he became a King's Commissioner in Groningen.
 4 September: Lily Jacobs (PvdA) is installed in the European Parliament as a replacement for Max van den Berg.
 16 October: Joop Post (CDA) leaves the European Parliament, because of a scandal with an investment project.
 17 October: Cornelis Visser (CDA) is installed in the European Parliament as a replacement for Joop Post.

2008
 20 April: Edith Mastenbroek (PvdA) leaves the European Parliament, because of health issues.
 8 May: Jan Cremers (PvdA) is installed in the European Parliament as a replacement for Edith Mastenbroek.

Alphabetical

| style="text-align:left;" colspan="11" | 
|-
! Name
! Sex
! National party
! EP Group
! Period
! Preference vote
|-
| style="text-align:left;" | Bas Belder
| style="text-align:left;" | Male
| style="text-align:left;" |  Reformed Political Party
| style="text-align:left;" |  IND&DEM
| style="text-align:left;" | 20 July 1999 – 2 July 2019
| style="text-align:left;" | 44,473
|-
| style="text-align:left;" | Max van den Berg
| style="text-align:left;" | Male
| style="text-align:left;" |  Labour Party
| style="text-align:left;" |  PES
| style="text-align:left;" | 20 July 1999 – 1 September 2007
| style="text-align:left;" | 879,972
|-
| style="text-align:left;" | Thijs Berman
| style="text-align:left;" | Male
| style="text-align:left;" |  Labour Party
| style="text-align:left;" |  PES
| style="text-align:left;" | 20 July 2004 – 1 July 2014
| style="text-align:left;" | 6,825
|-
| style="text-align:left;" | Hans Blokland
| style="text-align:left;" | Male
| style="text-align:left;" |  Christian Union
| style="text-align:left;" |  IND&DEM
| style="text-align:left;" | 19 July 1994 – 14 July 2009
| style="text-align:left;" | 197,031
|-
| style="text-align:left;" | Emine Bozkurt
| style="text-align:left;" | Female
| style="text-align:left;" |  Labour Party
| style="text-align:left;" |  PES
| style="text-align:left;" | 20 July 2004 – 1 July 2014
| style="text-align:left;" | 24,359
|-
| style="text-align:left;" | Paul van Buitenen
| style="text-align:left;" | Male
| style="text-align:left;" |  Europe Transparent
| style="text-align:left;" |  G–EFA
| style="text-align:left;" | 20 July 2004 – 14 July 2009
| style="text-align:left;" | 338,477
|-
| style="text-align:left;" | Kathalijne Buitenweg
| style="text-align:left;" | Female
| style="text-align:left;" |  GreenLeft
| style="text-align:left;" |  G–EFA
| style="text-align:left;" | 20 July 1999 – 14 July 2009
| style="text-align:left;" | 297,237
|-
| style="text-align:left;" | Ieke van den Burg
| style="text-align:left;" | Female
| style="text-align:left;" |  Labour Party
| style="text-align:left;" |  PES
| style="text-align:left;" | 20 July 1999 – 14 July 2009
| style="text-align:left;" | 7,695
|-
| style="text-align:left;" | Jan Cremers
| style="text-align:left;" | Male
| style="text-align:left;" |  Labour Party
| style="text-align:left;" |  PES
| style="text-align:left;" | 8 May 2008 – 14 July 2009
| style="text-align:left;" | 3,787
|-
| style="text-align:left;" | Dorette Corbey
| style="text-align:left;" | Female
| style="text-align:left;" |  Labour Party
| style="text-align:left;" |  PES
| style="text-align:left;" | 20 July 1999 – 14 July 2009
| style="text-align:left;" | 17,847
|-
| style="text-align:left;" | Bert Doorn
| style="text-align:left;" | Male
| style="text-align:left;" |  Christian Democratic Appeal
| style="text-align:left;" |  EPP–ED
| style="text-align:left;" | 20 July 1999 – 14 July 2009
| style="text-align:left;" | 4,842
|-
| style="text-align:left;" | Camiel Eurlings
| style="text-align:left;" | Male
| style="text-align:left;" |  Christian Democratic Appeal
| style="text-align:left;" |  EPP–ED
| style="text-align:left;" | 20 July 2004 – 22 February 2007
| style="text-align:left;" | 938,025
|-
| style="text-align:left;" | Els de Groen-Kouwenhoven
| style="text-align:left;" | Female
| style="text-align:left;" |  Europe Transparent
| style="text-align:left;" |  G–EFA
| style="text-align:left;" | 20 July 2004 – 14 July 2009
| style="text-align:left;" | 4,796
|-
| style="text-align:left;" | Jeanine Hennis-Plasschaert
| style="text-align:left;" | Female
| style="text-align:left;" |  People's Party for Freedom and Democracy
| style="text-align:left;" |  ALDE
| style="text-align:left;" | 20 July 2004 – 17 June 2010
| style="text-align:left;" | 44,064
|-
| style="text-align:left;" | 
| style="text-align:left;" | Female
| style="text-align:left;" |  Labour Party
| style="text-align:left;" |  PES
| style="text-align:left;" | 4 September 2007 – 14 July 2009
| style="text-align:left;" | 10,983
|-
| style="text-align:left;" | Joost Lagendijk
| style="text-align:left;" | Male
| style="text-align:left;" |  GreenLeft
| style="text-align:left;" |  G–EFA
| style="text-align:left;" | 1 September 1998 – 14 July 2009
| style="text-align:left;" | 12,405
|-
| style="text-align:left;" | Esther de Lange
| style="text-align:left;" | Female
| style="text-align:left;" |  Christian Democratic Appeal
| style="text-align:left;" |  EPP–ED
| style="text-align:left;" | 12 April 2007 – Present
| style="text-align:left;" | 2,754
|-
| style="text-align:left;" | Kartika Liotard
| style="text-align:left;" | Female
| style="text-align:left;" |  Socialist Party
| style="text-align:left;" |  EUL–NGL
| style="text-align:left;" | 20 July 2004 – 1 July 2014
| style="text-align:left;" | 32,187
|-
| style="text-align:left;" | Albert Jan Maat
| style="text-align:left;" | Male
| style="text-align:left;" |  Christian Democratic Appeal
| style="text-align:left;" |  EPP–ED
| style="text-align:left;" | 20 July 1999 – 10 April 2007
| style="text-align:left;" | 30,948
|-
| style="text-align:left;" | Jules Maaten
| style="text-align:left;" | Male
| style="text-align:left;" |  People's Party for Freedom and Democracy
| style="text-align:left;" |  ALDE
| style="text-align:left;" | 20 July 1999 – 14 July 20092 July 2019 – 2 July 2019
| style="text-align:left;" | 412,688
|-
| style="text-align:left;" | Toine Manders
| style="text-align:left;" | Male
| style="text-align:left;" |  People's Party for Freedom and Democracy
| style="text-align:left;" |  ALDE
| style="text-align:left;" | 20 July 1999 – 1 July 2014
| style="text-align:left;" | 32,819
|-
| style="text-align:left;" | Maria Martens
| style="text-align:left;" | Female
| style="text-align:left;" |  Christian Democratic Appeal
| style="text-align:left;" |  EPP–ED
| style="text-align:left;" | 20 July 1999 – 14 July 2009
| style="text-align:left;" | 50,493
|-
| style="text-align:left;" | Edith Mastenbroek
| style="text-align:left;" | Female
| style="text-align:left;" |  Labour Party
| style="text-align:left;" |  PES
| style="text-align:left;" | 20 July 2004 – 20 April 2008
| style="text-align:left;" | 92,018
|-
| style="text-align:left;" | Erik Meijer
| style="text-align:left;" | Male
| style="text-align:left;" |  Socialist Party
| style="text-align:left;" |  EUL–NGL
| style="text-align:left;" | 20 July 1999 – 14 July 2009
| style="text-align:left;" | 230,531
|-
| style="text-align:left;" | Jan Mulder
| style="text-align:left;" | Male
| style="text-align:left;" |  People's Party for Freedom and Democracy
| style="text-align:left;" |  ALDE
| style="text-align:left;" | 19 July 1994 – 14 July 2009 22 June 2010 – 1 July 2014
| style="text-align:left;" | 43,376
|-
| style="text-align:left;" | Lambert van Nistelrooij
| style="text-align:left;" | Male
| style="text-align:left;" |  Christian Democratic Appeal
| style="text-align:left;" |  EPP–ED
| style="text-align:left;" | 20 July 2004 – Present
| style="text-align:left;" | 27,957
|-
| style="text-align:left;" | Ria Oomen-Ruijten
| style="text-align:left;" | Female
| style="text-align:left;" |  Christian Democratic Appeal
| style="text-align:left;" |  EPP–ED
| style="text-align:left;" | 19 July 1994 – 1 July 2014
| style="text-align:left;" | 29,719
|-
| style="text-align:left;" | Joop Post
| style="text-align:left;" | Male
| style="text-align:left;" |  Christian Democratic Appeal
| style="text-align:left;" |  EPP–ED
| style="text-align:left;" | 1 March 2007 – 16 October 2007
| style="text-align:left;" | 7,515
|-
| style="text-align:left;" | Sophie in 't Veld
| style="text-align:left;" | Female
| style="text-align:left;" |  Democrats 66
| style="text-align:left;" |  ALDE
| style="text-align:left;" | 20 July 2004 – Present
| style="text-align:left;" | 161,104
|-
| style="text-align:left;" | Cornelis Visser
| style="text-align:left;" | Male
| style="text-align:left;" |  Christian Democratic Appeal
| style="text-align:left;" |  EPP–ED
| style="text-align:left;" | 17 October 2007 – 14 July 2009
| style="text-align:left;" | 3,832
|-
| style="text-align:left;" | Jan-Marinus Wiersma
| style="text-align:left;" | Male
| style="text-align:left;" |  Labour Party
| style="text-align:left;" |  PES
| style="text-align:left;" | 19 July 1994 – 14 July 2009
| style="text-align:left;" | 27,067
|-
| style="text-align:left;" | Corien Wortmann-Kool
| style="text-align:left;" | Female
| style="text-align:left;" |  Christian Democratic Appeal
| style="text-align:left;" |  EPP–ED
| style="text-align:left;" | 20 July 2004 – 1 July 2014
| style="text-align:left;" | 9,776
|-style="background-color:#dcdcdc"
| style="text-align:left;" colspan="6" |Source:
|-
|}

By party

On the Christian Democratic Appeal list: (EPP-ED Group)

 Bert Doorn
 Camiel Eurlings (top candidate) (replaced by: Joop Post)
 Albert-Jan Maat (replaced by: Esther de Lange)
 Maria Martens
 Lambert van Nistelrooij
 Ria Oomen-Ruijten
 Corien Wortmann-Kool
 Esther de Lange
 Joop Post (replaced by: Cornelis Visser)
 Cornelis Visser

On the Labour Party list: (PES)

 Max van den Berg (top candidate) (replaced by: Lily Jacobs)
 Thijs Berman
 Emine Bozkurt
 Ieke van den Burg
 Dorette Corbey
 Edith Mastenbroek (replaced by: Jan Cremers)
 Jan-Marinus Wiersma
 Jan Cremers
 Lily Jacobs

On the People's Party for Freedom and Democracy list: (ALDE)

 Jeanine Hennis-Plasschaert
 Jules Maaten (top candidate)
 Toine Manders
 Jan Mulder

On the GreenLeft list: (Greens-EFA)

 Kathalijne Buitenweg (top candidate)
 Joost Lagendijk

On the Europe Transparent list: (Greens-EFA)

 Paul van Buitenen (top candidate)
 Els de Groen

On the Socialist Party list: (EUL/NGL)

 Kartika Liotard
 Erik Meijer (top candidate)

On the Christian Union – Reformed Political Party list: (IND&DEM)

 Hans Blokland (Christian Union) (top candidate)
 Bas Belder (Reformed Political Party)

On the Democrats 66 list: (ALDE)

 Sophie in 't Veld (top candidate)

Independent: (left their party delegation at some point during this European 2004–2009 session.)
 Els de Groen

References 

2004
Netherlands
List